Aprelsky is a rural locality (a settlement) in Daktuyskoye Rural Settlement of Magdagachinsky District, Amur Oblast, Russia. The population was 245 as of 2018.

Geography 
Aprelsky is located 58 km east of Magdagachi (the district's administrative centre) by road. Pioner is the nearest rural locality.

References 

Rural localities in Magdagachinsky District